Walville is an extinct town in Lewis County, in the U.S. state of Washington. The GNIS classifies it as a populated place.

A post office called Walville was established in 1903, and remained in operation until 1936. The community's name is an amalgamation of Walworth and Neville Company.

References

Ghost towns in Lewis County, Washington